Hotel Brigham is a historic three-story hotel building in Brigham City, Utah. It was built in 1914 by George Burnham for James Knudson, a Mormon businessman, and his wife Amelia. It was designed in the Chicago school style by architects Francis Charles Woods and Julius A. Smith, and expanded ten years later, in 1924. The Knudsons died in the early 1940s, and the hotel was acquired by the Hillam Abstracting and Insurance Agency in 1989. It has been listed on the National Register of Historic Places since October 17, 1991.

References

National Register of Historic Places in Box Elder County, Utah
Chicago school architecture in the United States
Hotel buildings completed in 1914
Hotel buildings on the National Register of Historic Places in Utah